During the 1946–47 English football season, Brentford competed in the Football League First Division. The Bees' 12-year run in the First Division ended with relegation to the Second Division after a disastrous season, which tied the club record for fewest league victories and most league defeats. The club did not play again in the top-tier until 2021–22, 74 years later.

Season summary 
After three successive top-six finishes in the First Division beginning in 1935–36, Brentford's decline began with the departure of key players during the 1938–39 season, which culminated with a near-relegation. For 1946–47, the first Football League season since the end of the Second World War, manager Harry Curtis was able to call on many of his regular players from the final pre-war seasons, though the elder players, such as Irish international full back Bill Gorman, utility man Buster Brown and former Wales forward Idris Hopkins, were all at age 35. Long-serving forward and once-capped England international Billy Scott had remained with the club and was then aged 38. The team fielded versus Aston Villa on 1 February 1947 was the oldest in club history, with an average age of over 31.5 years. Curtis supplemented the squad by bringing in wing half Cyril Toulouse and forwards John Gillies, Maurice Roberts and George Stewart. As in the final pre-war seasons, Curtis would also promote players from the Bees' reserve ranks, signing amateur Roddy Munro to a professional contract and handing debuts to Frank Latimer, John Moore and Wally Bragg, with Bragg going on to become the youngest-ever Brentford debutant at that time.

Brentford had a good start to the season, winning four of the first five matches and going top on the opening day. The majority of the team's goals were scored by forwards Gerry McAloon, Fred Durrant and George Wilkins, but when the goals dried up in September 1946, Brentford's form took a turn for the worse. Matters were made worse when McAloon and Durrant were quickly sold to Celtic and Queens Park Rangers respectively. A supporter, writing to The Brentford & Chiswick Times, commented "it would seem that Brentford were unaware when they allowed them to go that Thomas, Durrant and McAloon had scored very nearly all the side’s goals in the previous season". Manager Curtis received half back George Paterson from Celtic in part exchange for McAloon and also strengthened the team with full back Malky Macdonald and forward Archie Macaulay. By December, Brentford had dropped into the relegation places and a run of 11 losses in 15 matches culminated in the heaviest defeat of the season – 6–1 away to Sheffield United on Christmas Day.

Brentford's form improved after the Christmas Day thrashing, going undefeated in four of the following five matches to climb out of the relegation places, but from February 1947 onwards, the team's form evaporated. Despite Len Townsend coming into form and going on to become the Bees' top scorer for the season, the goalscoring problem was compounded by the transfer request and subsequent sale of George Wilkins in February. Bill Naylor and Dickie Girling were signed in February to bolster the forward line, but scored just three goals between them before the end of the season. On 24 May, defeat to Sunderland and a draw for 20th-place Charlton Athletic away to Everton consigned the Bees to relegation to the Second Division. By the time of the final day of the season on 14 June, Brentford had lost 14 of the final 19 matches.

The relegation was the first suffered by the club since it joined the Football League in 1920 and it was the club's final top-flight season until 2021–22, 74 years later. A number of club Football League records were equalled or broken during the season, including fewest victories (9), fewest home victories (5), most defeats (26), most home defeats (11), fewest home goals scored (19) and highest average attendance (25,768).

League table

Results
Brentford's goal tally listed first.

Legend

Football League First Division

FA Cup

 Sources: 100 Years of Brentford, 11v11, Brentford Football Club History

Playing squad 
Players' ages are as of the opening day of the 1946–47 season.

 Sources: 100 Years of Brentford, Timeless Bees, Football League Players' Records 1888 to 1939

Coaching staff

Statistics

Appearances and goals

Players listed in italics left the club mid-season.
Source: 100 Years of Brentford

Goalscorers 

Players listed in italics left the club mid-season.
Source: 100 Years of Brentford

International caps

Management

Summary

Transfers & loans 
Cricketers are not included in this list.

Notes

References 

Brentford F.C. seasons
Brentford